Lecithocera itrinea is a moth in the family Lecithoceridae. It was described by Edward Meyrick in 1910. It is found in Sri Lanka and southern India.

The wingspan is 12–13 mm. The forewings are brownish, irrorated (sprinkled) with dark fuscous. The stigmata are very cloudy and dark fuscous, the plical hardly marked, the second discal sometimes forming a transverse mark. The hindwings are light fuscous.

References

Moths described in 1910
itrinea